Measure may refer to:

 Measurement, the assignment of a number to a characteristic of an object or event

Law
 Ballot measure, proposed legislation in the United States
 Church of England Measure, legislation of the Church of England 
 Measure of the National Assembly for Wales, primary legislation in Wales
 Assembly Measure of the Northern Ireland Assembly (1973)

Science and mathematics 
 Measure (data warehouse), a property on which calculations can be made 
 Measure (mathematics), a systematic way to assign a number to each suitable subset of a given set
 Measure (physics), a way to integrate over all possible histories of a system in quantum field theory
 Measure (termination), in computer program termination analysis
 Measuring coalgebra, a coalgebra constructed from two algebras
 Measure (Apple), an iOS augmented reality app

Other uses 
 Measure (album), by Matt Pond PA, 2000, and its title track
 Measure (bartending) or jigger, a bartending tool used to measure liquor
 Measure (journal), an international journal of formal poetry
 "Measures" (Justified), a 2012 episode of the TV series Justified
 Measure (music), or bar, in musical notation
 Measure (typography), line length in characters per line
 Coal measures, the coal-bearing part of the Upper Carboniferous System
 The Measure (SA), an American punk rock band
Bar (Music), a time segment in musical notation

See also 

 Countermeasure, a measure or action taken to counter or offset another one
 Quantity, a property that can exist as a multitude or magnitude
 Measure for Measure, a play by William Shakespeare